The DANA (Dělo automobilní nabíjené automaticky (gun on truck loaded automatically) is a wheeled self-propelled artillery piece. It is also known as the Samohybná Kanónová Húfnica vzor 77 (ShKH vz. 77; self-propelled gun howitzer model 77). It was designed by Konštrukta Trenčín and built by ZTS Dubnica nad Váhom in the former Czechoslovakia (now Slovakia). Introduced in the 1970s, it was the first wheeled 152 mm self-propelled artillery gun to enter service. It is based on a modified eight-wheel drive (8×8) Tatra 815 chassis with excellent cross-country mobility. Currently it is in service with the Czech Republic, Libya, Poland, Georgia, Azerbaijan, Slovakia, and Ukraine.

Compared to tracked vehicles, wheeled vehicles have the advantages of being cheaper to build and easier to maintain with greater mobility. Tire pressure can be regulated to allow good mobility off-road and there is power-assisted steering on the front four wheels. It lowers 3 hydraulic stabilizers into the ground before firing, and has a roof mounted crane to assist with ammunition loading.

The crew of the DANA consists of the driver (operates the hydraulic stabilizers) and commander sitting in the front cabin, the gunner (aims the gun and opens fire) and loader operator (selects the appropriate amount of powder charges) are on the left side of the turret, the ammo handler (sets the shells' primers) is on the right side turret.

Original Dana had manual fire control and automatic reloader. Latest version Dana M2 has also computerized automatic fire control, allowing reduction of crew to as few as only 2 persons.

Development
The DANA was designed in the late 1970s by Konštrukta Trenčín to provide the Czechoslovak People's Army with an indigenous self-propelled indirect fire support weapon without having to resort to purchasing the Soviet 2S3 Akatsiya SPG. Design work was completed in 1976 and the DANA project was handed off to production at ZTS Dubnica nad Váhom. It was accepted into service in 1981, and by 1994 over 750 units had been built. The DANA was also exported to Poland and Libya.

Design
The DANA was a significant departure from contemporary self-propelled guns as it used a wheeled chassis and featured an innovative automated loading system which was the first of its kind at the time of its introduction to service. The vehicle has a driving cabin at the front, an open-topped fighting compartment at mid-length and the engine compartment in the rear. The front crew cabin seats both the driver/mechanic and vehicle commander. The armoured turret is installed on a traversable mount adapted to the Tatra 815 wheeled chassis (8x8) and is divided into two halves, divided by the howitzer's recoil mechanism and a pathway for the reciprocating action during firing. The left half of the turret is occupied by the gunner and first loader and houses the various fire control optics, electro-mechanical gun laying controls, the automatic propellant charge feeding device, and an auxiliary ammunition magazine. The right side of the turret contains a mechanized projectile delivery system which is operated by a second loader at this position.

The DANA's primary weapon is a 152 mm howitzer with a monolithic barrel (with a fixed rifling pitch) equipped with one expansion chamber. The howitzer has a semi-automatic, vertically-sliding-wedge-type breech which opens to the left side. The recoil assembly consists of a hydraulic buffer, two pneumatic return cylinders and a controlling plunger which governs the displacement of the buffering system. The gun laying is carried out by an electro-hydraulic drive system or an emergency manual control.

DANA's unique feature is that its autoloader is able to load a shell and a cartridge in any elevation of the barrel.

As there is no gyroscopic or similar system for independent, automated and autonomous gun laying in the DANA, the gunner of howitzer uses a ZZ-73 panoramic telescope with a PG1-M-D collimator for indirect gun laying. This sight has a horizontal scale used to set the appropriate horizontal laying via aiming at reference points. This means that the DANA is not an autonomous system there needs to be an additional device to assist in gun laying (in fact, the firing positions of such artillery systems are usually prepared before the guns are positioned there). For direct fire engagements, the gunner uses an OP5-38-D telescopic sight.

Ammunition
As of 2014, there are three main shell types used by Czech Army:
 152-EOF, which means "high-explosive" with a maximum range of 
 152-EOFd, which means "high-explosive long-range" with a maximum range of 
 152-EPrSv, which means "high-explosive anti-tank" used for direct-fire at armored targets

General characteristics
 Length: 
 Width: 2.8 m (9 ft)
 Height: 2.6 m (8.53 ft)
 Weight: 23,000 kg (50,706 lbs)
 Performance:
 Maximum Road Speed: 80 km/h (50 mph)
 Range: 600 km (373 mi)
 Rate of Fire: 3 rpm for 30 minutes
 Maximum Gun Range: 28 km (17 mi)
 Fording: 1.4 m (4.59 ft)
 Vertical Obstacle: 1.5 m (5 ft)
 Trench: 1.4 m (4.59 ft)
 Crew: 4 to 5
 Armament:
 Primary: 152 mm gun-howitzer, length: 5,580 mm (37 calibers)
 Secondary: 12.7 mm machine gun (MG) DShK
 Elevation: -4° to +70°
 Traverse: ±45°
 Powerplant: one V-12 air cooled diesel Tatra T2-939-34 engine delivering 345 horsepower (257.27 kW)

Variants

Combat history
Used by Georgia against Russia during the Russo-Georgian War. Two Georgian DANAs were destroyed and two captured in 2008.

Used by Poland during the War in Afghanistan (2001–2021). Five Polish DANAs had been used in Afghanistan in Ghazni Province since 2008. 

Used by Azerbaijan in the 2020 Nagorno-Karabakh war against Armenia.

Used by Ukraine during the 2022 Russian invasion of Ukraine. An unknown number of 152 mm ShKH DANA M2 and 152 mm ShKH DANA vz. 77 were supplied by the Czech Republic in 2022.

Operators

Current operators
 – unknown quantity of DANA M1
 – 164 vz. 77 (to 1 July 2008) of original 273
 – 111 vz. 77
 – 135 vz. 77 and 16 M2000 Zuzana
 – 47 vz. 77 delivered by the Czech Republic from 2004
 – 12 M2000G Zuzana via Greece
 – 26 152 mm ShKH DANA M2 were ordered in 2020. An unknown number of 152 mm ShKH DANA M2 and 152 mm ShKH DANA vz. 77 were supplied by the Czech Republic in 2022.

Former operators
 – 80 delivered in the 1980s. Retired in the 1990s.
 – 108

Comparable weapons

Archer Artillery System
ATMOS 2000
A-222 Bereg
2S22 Bohdana
CAESAR self-propelled howitzer
G6 Rhino
AHS Kryl
Nora B-52
PCL-09
PCL-161
PCL-181
PLL-09
Type 19 155 mm Wheeled Self-propelled Howitzer 
155 mm SpGH Zuzana

References

External links 

Self-propelled artillery of Czechoslovakia
Armoured fighting vehicles of the Czech Republic
Self-propelled artillery of Slovakia
152 mm artillery
Czechoslovakia–Poland relations
Wheeled self-propelled howitzers
Eight-wheeled vehicles
Military vehicles introduced in the 1980s